Nicholas Monroe and John-Patrick Smith were the defending champions, but chose not to participate together. Monroe played alongside Frances Tiafoe, but lost in the first round to Marcelo Arévalo and Miguel Ángel Reyes-Varela. Smith teamed up with Ben McLachlan but lost in the quarterfinals to Jack Sock and Jackson Withrow.

Dominic Inglot and Austin Krajicek won the title, defeating Bob and Mike Bryan in the final, 6–4, 6–7(5–7), [11–9].

Seeds

Draw

Draw

References

External Links
 Main Draw

BB&T Atlanta Open - Doubles
BB&T Atlanta Open - Doubles
2019 Doubles